Jane Grey Burgio (July 8, 1922 – December 20, 2005), an American Republican politician, served as Secretary of State of New Jersey and as a member of the New Jersey General Assembly.

Biography

Burgio was born and raised in Nutley and graduated in 1940 from Nutley High School, later attending Caldwell College and Essex County College. She lived in North Caldwell.  She served as Vice Chair of the Essex County Republican Committee and as a Commissioner of the Essex County Board of Elections.  Her sister, Ruth Bedford, was also a Republican activist.  Her brother-in-law, Stanley Bedford, served as a New Jersey Superior Court Judge.  Her grandfather, Abraham Blum, was the first Mayor of Nutley.

In 1973, after the primary election had already been held, incumbent Assemblyman Philip D. Kaltenbacher announced that he would not run for re-election. Essex County Republicans held a meeting and picked Burgio as his replacement. Burgio's running mate was Thomas H. Kean. Kean and Burgio defeated their Democratic opponents, Thomas Giblin and Nicholas Saleeby.  Kean and Burgio were re-elected in 1975.

Kean gave up his Assembly seat in 1977 to pursue election as governor. Essex County Republican County Chairman Frederic Remington became Burgio's new running mate.  They faced a primary and beat Wayne mayor Newton Edward Miller, Norman Lapidus, a businessman from Maplewood, Melvin I. Tolstoi, and Shirley Szabo.  In November, Burgio and Remington prevailed over the Democrats, Livingston mayor Donald S. Coburn and Bernie Reiner.

In 1979, Burgio and Remington were re-elected.  Defeated were Alex Trento and James Bildner.

In 1981, James Wallwork gave up his New Jersey Senate seat to become a Republican gubernatorial candidate.  Burgio and Remington both wanted to run for the Senate, but when their shared hometown of North Caldwell was moved into a different district, neither of them ran for anything.

After Kean was elected Governor of New Jersey in 1981, he asked Burgio to become his Secretary of State, the first woman to serve in that role. She accepted and served in that office through the entire eight years of the Kean administration.  She retired with Kean in January 1990.

In 1996, Burgio attempted a political comeback as a candidate for the position of Surrogate of Essex County, but lost by a very big margin.

Burgio died on December 20, 2005.

References

External links

Republican Party members of the New Jersey General Assembly
Caldwell University alumni
Essex County College alumni
Nutley High School alumni
People from North Caldwell, New Jersey
People from West Caldwell, New Jersey
People from Nutley, New Jersey
Politicians from Essex County, New Jersey
Women state legislators in New Jersey
Secretaries of State of New Jersey
1922 births
2005 deaths
20th-century American politicians
20th-century American women politicians
21st-century American women